Biotus is a genus of ant-loving beetles in the family Staphylinidae. There is one described species in Biotus, B. formicarius.

References

Further reading

 
 

Pselaphitae
Articles created by Qbugbot